

Derivation

Hogge is a Scottish surname originally derived from hoga, an Old English term meaning prudent or careful.

During the 19th century many immigrants from Scotland settled along the east coast of what would become the United States and Canada. Many Hogge settlers came during this time but there were others who came much earlier during the 17th century. The majority of Hogge's were farmers. Settlers who remained faithful to the crown and called themselves United Empire Loyalists while others participated in the American War of Independence. That spirit lives on today and is evident in the highland games that dot North America.

Passenger and immigration lists indicate that members of the Hogge family came to North America quite early: Daniel Hogg settled in Boston in 1651; along with John and Neile, Bernard, Charles, James, John, Peter, Richard and William Hogue all arrived in Philadelphia between 1840 and 1860.

In the early 20th century the Hogge family located in New Kent, Virginia married into and became a part of the Chickahominy Indians Eastern Division and currently holds 2 seats on the Tribal Council.

Variations

With spelling practices being non-standardized in the Middle Ages, scribes could only rely on the sounds of words for spelling. Spelling variations in names, even within a single document, were a common result. Over the years Hogge has appeared Hogge, Hoge, Hoag, Hogue, Hodge, Hogg, Hoig, and others.

References

Surnames

ru:Смит